This is a list of cases reported in volume 279 of United States Reports, decided by the Supreme Court of the United States in 1929.

Justices of the Supreme Court at the time of volume 279 U.S. 

The Supreme Court is established by Article III, Section 1 of the Constitution of the United States, which says: "The judicial Power of the United States, shall be vested in one supreme Court . . .". The size of the Court is not specified; the Constitution leaves it to Congress to set the number of justices. Under the Judiciary Act of 1789 Congress originally fixed the number of justices at six (one chief justice and five associate justices). Since 1789 Congress has varied the size of the Court from six to seven, nine, ten, and back to nine justices (always including one chief justice).

When the cases in volume 279 were decided the Court comprised the following nine members:

Notable Case in 279 U.S.

United States v. Schwimmer
United States v. Schwimmer,  279 U.S. 644 (1929), concerned a pacifist applicant for naturalization who in the interview declared not to be willing to "take up arms personally" in defense of the United States. Originally found unable by the District Court for the Northern District of Illinois to take the prescribed oath of allegiance, a decision reversed on appeal, the case was ultimately argued before the Supreme Court, which ruled against the applicant and so denied her the possibility of becoming a United States citizen.

In his dissenting opinion, Justice O.W. Holmes wrote:

"The views referred to are an extreme opinion in favor of pacifism and a statement that she would not bear arms to defend the Constitution. So far as the adequacy of her oath is concerned, I hardly can see how that is affected by the statement, inasmuch as she is a woman over fifty years of age, and would not be allowed to bear arms if she wanted to. . . . [I]f there is any principle of the Constitution that more imperatively calls for attachment than any other it is the principle of free thought -— not free thought for those who agree with us but freedom for the thought that we hate."

Citation style 

Under the Judiciary Act of 1789 the federal court structure at the time comprised District Courts, which had general trial jurisdiction; Circuit Courts, which had mixed trial and appellate (from the US District Courts) jurisdiction; and the United States Supreme Court, which had appellate jurisdiction over the federal District and Circuit courts—and for certain issues over state courts. The Supreme Court also had limited original jurisdiction (i.e., in which cases could be filed directly with the Supreme Court without first having been heard by a lower federal or state court). There were one or more federal District Courts and/or Circuit Courts in each state, territory, or other geographical region.

The Judiciary Act of 1891 created the United States Courts of Appeals and reassigned the jurisdiction of most routine appeals from the district and circuit courts to these appellate courts. The Act created nine new courts that were originally known as the "United States Circuit Courts of Appeals." The new courts had jurisdiction over most appeals of lower court decisions. The Supreme Court could review either legal issues that a court of appeals certified or decisions of court of appeals by writ of certiorari. On January 1, 1912, the effective date of the Judicial Code of 1911, the old Circuit Courts were abolished, with their remaining trial court jurisdiction transferred to the U.S. District Courts.

Bluebook citation style is used for case names, citations, and jurisdictions.
 "# Cir." = United States Court of Appeals
 e.g., "3d Cir." = United States Court of Appeals for the Third Circuit
 e.g.,"D. Mass." = United States District Court for the District of Massachusetts
 "E." = Eastern; "M." = Middle; "N." = Northern; "S." = Southern; "W." = Western
 e.g.,"M.D. Ala." = United States District Court for the Middle District of Alabama
 "Ct. Cl." = United States Court of Claims
 The abbreviation of a state's name alone indicates the highest appellate court in that state's judiciary at the time.
 e.g.,"Pa." = Supreme Court of Pennsylvania
 e.g.,"Me." = Supreme Judicial Court of Maine

List of cases in volume 279 U.S.

Notes and references

External links
  Case reports in volume 279 from Library of Congress
  Case reports in volume 279 from Court Listener
  Case reports in volume 279 from the Caselaw Access Project of Harvard Law School
  Case reports in volume 279 from Google Scholar
  Case reports in volume 279 from Justia
  Case reports in volume 279 from Open Jurist
 Website of the United States Supreme Court
 United States Courts website about the Supreme Court
 National Archives, Records of the Supreme Court of the United States
 American Bar Association, How Does the Supreme Court Work?
 The Supreme Court Historical Society